Kurram Garhi Hydropower Plant (KGHPP) is a small, low-head, run-of-the-river hydroelectric power generation station of 4.0 megawatt generation capacity (four units of 1.0 MW each), located at Kurram Garhi, a small town in Bannu KPK province of Pakistan on the flows of Kuchkot Canal from Kurram River. It is a small hydel power generating plant constructed and put in commercial operation in February 1958 with the Average Annual generating capacity of 17 million units (GWh) of least expensive electricity.

See also 

 List of dams and reservoirs in Pakistan
 List of power stations in Pakistan
 Khan Khwar Hydropower Project
 Satpara Dam
 Gomal Zam Dam
 Duber Khwar hydropower project

References 

Dams in Pakistan
Dams completed in 1963
Hydroelectric power stations in Pakistan
Kurram District